Brustiarius is a genus of freshwater sea catfishes found  in the Malay Archipelago. There are currently two described species.

Species
 Brustiarius nox (Herre, 1935) (Comb-gilled catfish)
 Brustiarius solidus (Herre, 1935) (Hard-palate catfish)

References
 

Ariidae
Taxa named by Albert William Herre
Catfish genera
Freshwater fish genera